Kailash Chawla (born 1948) is an Indian politician who is a leader of Bharatiya Janta Party from Madhya Pradesh. He is a member of Madhya Pradesh Legislative Assembly elected from Mandsaur district. He served as cabinet minister in Patwa ministry.

References

2. http://myneta.info/mp2013/candidate.php?candidate_id=660

3. https://nocorruption.in/politician/kailash-chawla/

4. https://www.youtube.com/watch?v=0AJoJGvVNAQ

5. https://www.facebook.com/search/top/?q=Kailash+Chawla

6. https://www.facebook.com/profile.php?id=100004570425493

7. Ex-chairman MPSIDC - Industrial Development Corp

8. https://www.facebook.com/Mpsidc

1948 births
Living people
People from Mandsaur district
State cabinet ministers of Madhya Pradesh
Madhya Pradesh MLAs 2013–2018
Bharatiya Janata Party politicians from Madhya Pradesh